Nirou Moharekeh Qazvin Football Club is an Iranian football club based in Qazvin, Iran. They play in the Iran Football's 2nd Division. The team is sponsored by Nirou Moharekeh Iran Co. (NMI) who have a factory in Qazvin, the team is heavily supported by the people of Qazvin as it is the city's best club.

They were relegated to Iran Football's 2nd Division in the 2003–2004 season, in which they only won 5 games out of 30.

Season-by-season
The table below chronicles the achievements of Nirou Moharekeh Qazvin in various competitions since 2002.

Club managers
Mehdi Tondaki 2004–2005
Alireza Rokhcheka 2005–2006

References

Football clubs in Iran
Sport in Qazvin Province
1985 establishments in Iran
2009 disestablishments in Iran
Association football clubs 1985 season
Association football clubs disestablished in 2009